South Broadway is an inner-city neighborhood in Albuquerque, New Mexico, located southeast of Downtown. The neighborhood developed between the 1890s and early 1900s and has a housing stock consisting mainly of smaller Victorian homes and bungalows. It was historically a diverse working-class neighborhood and the center of the city's African American community. Along with other New Mexican cities such as  Clovis and Hobbs, the neighborhood is one of the centers of Black American culture and history in New Mexico. 

Today, a sizeable African American community has presence in this area outering downtown Albuquerque, as well as the area near Highland High School, which is about 8% Black, as of 2021.

Geography
According to the South Broadway Neighborhood association, the boundaries of the neighborhood are the Burlington Northern Santa Fe railroad tracks to the west, Coal Avenue to the north, Interstate 25 to the east, and Gibson Boulevard, Broadway Boulevard, and Kathryn Avenue to the south. Adjoining neighborhoods include Barelas to the west, Huning Highlands to the north, and San Jose to the south. The terrain consists of rising sand hills which increase in elevation from west to east.

Demographics
The 2010 United States Census recorded a population in South Broadway of approximately 4,175 residents. The racial breakdown of the neighborhood was 80% Hispanic, 11% non-Hispanic white, 6% Black, 1% American Indian, and 2% other races or mixed-race.

History
South Broadway was platted in the 1880s, not long after the arrival of the Atchison, Topeka, and Santa Fe Railway launched the development of what is now Downtown Albuquerque and the surrounding areas. The neighborhood was mostly built up between the 1890s and early 20th century and contains a variety of modestly-sized Victorian homes. It was historically a diverse working-class community, with many of its residents employed at the nearby Santa Fe Railway Shops and Albuquerque Foundry and Machine Works. South Broadway was also the center of Albuquerque's African American community and was home to many Black-owned businesses as well as New Mexico's oldest Black church, Grant Chapel AME.

Education
South Broadway is served by Albuquerque Public Schools. Public school students from the neighborhood attend Eugene Field or East San Jose Elementary School, Washington or Jefferson Middle School, and Albuquerque High School.

Transportation
The main thoroughfares in South Broadway are Broadway Boulevard (NM 47), which runs through the neighborhood from north to south, and Avenida César Chávez, which runs from east to west and connects with Barelas, the West Side, and the University of New Mexico South Campus. The neighborhood also has access to Interstate 25 immediately to the east.

Public bus transit in South Broadway is provided by ABQ RIDE's 16 Broadway-University-Gibson route.

References

African-American history of New Mexico
Neighborhoods in Albuquerque, New Mexico